The Morant Cays is an offshore island group 51 km SSE off Morant Point, Jamaica. It is one of two offshore island groups belonging to Jamaica, the other one is the Pedro Cays. The area of Morant Bank is about 100 km2. The aggregate land area of the four cays is only 16.0 hectares or 39.5 acres. The Morant Cays are low-lying, mostly uninhabited, seasonally visited by fishermen, and fronted by highly exposed reefs over which the sea constantly breaks.

History 
The cays were annexed in 1862 by the United Kingdom and added to Jamaica in 1882.

Flora and fauna 
The islands have sparse vegetation and are a seabird rookery and turtle nesting area.
Seabird eggs and guano are collected periodically.

Islets
There is a fishermen's camp, established by the Jamaican Ministry of Agriculture, with several huts and a water tank on the south side of the cay. There is a lighthouse at Breezy Point, the easternmost point of the cay and of Jamaica.

North-West Cay

Sand spits, which extend from its ends, alter in shape with the seasons of the year; in summer the SW spit is washed away and deposited on the W side of the cay.

A rocky ledge extending from the cay is used as a pier.

References

External links
Sailing Directions, Caribbean Sea, Vol. I
Gazetteer: Geographic Names of Jamaica

Islands of Jamaica
Seabird colonies
Geography of Saint Thomas Parish, Jamaica